John Bryson (November 30, 1849 – January 20, 1896) was a Quebec lumberman, farmer and political figure. He represented Pontiac in the House of Commons of Canada from 1882 to 1891 and from 1892 to 1896 as a Conservative Party of Canada member.

He was born in Fort Coulonge, Canada East, the son of George Bryson, Sr. and Robina Cobb. In 1874, he married Mary, the daughter of Thomas Bryson. Bryson was mayor of Mansfield from 1882 to 1889 and mayor of Fort Coulonge from 1889 to 1890. He was defeated when he ran for reelection provincially in 1891 by Thomas Murray but, following an appeal of the election results, won the by-election held in 1892. Bryson died in office at the age of 46.

His brother George served as a member of the province's Legislative Council.

References 

1849 births
1896 deaths
Canadian people of Scottish descent
Anglophone Quebec people
Members of the House of Commons of Canada from Quebec
Conservative Party of Canada (1867–1942) MPs
Mayors of places in Quebec
People from Outaouais